Deniz Haimerl (born 19 March 2003) is a German professional footballer who plays as a defender for FC Augsburg II.

Career statistics

Club

Notes

References

2003 births
21st-century German people
Living people
German footballers
Association football defenders
FC Bayern Munich footballers
SpVgg Unterhaching players
FC Augsburg II players
3. Liga players
Regionalliga players